Rebreuve-Ranchicourt is a commune in the Pas-de-Calais department in the Hauts-de-France region of France.

Geography
The commune was created in 1971 by the joining of the former communes Rebreuve-sous-les-Monts and Ranchicourt.

Population

Places of interest
 The church of Notre-Dame, dating from the nineteenth century.
 An eighteenth-century manorhouse.
 The church of St.Pierre, dating from the fifteenth century.
 The nineteenth-century château de Ranchicourt with an older dovecote and other outbuildings.

See also
Communes of the Pas-de-Calais department

References

Rebreuveranchicourt